McCalls Dam State Park is a Pennsylvania state park on  in Miles Township, Centre County, Pennsylvania in the United States. The park is in the easternmost tip of Centre County, south of Clinton County and north of Union County. McCalls Dam State Park is in a remote location on a gravel road between R. B. Winter State Park on Pennsylvania Route 192 and Eastville on Pennsylvania Route 880. The park can only be accessed in the winter months by snowmobiling or cross-country skiing.

McCalls Dam State Park has a small camping area and a small picnic area with a few tables and charcoal grills. There are no modern restroom facilities at the park and visitors are asked to carry out all trash as there is no trash pick up at the park.

The park is named for the splash dam that Johnny McCall built on White Deer Creek in 1850. He used the waters that flowed from the dam to power a sawmill. Sixteen years later the dam was rebuilt to provide water for a series of splash dams that were used to float white pine logs to the sawmills on the West Branch Susquehanna River at Watsontown. The park's facilities were originally constructed by the Civilian Conservation Corps in the 1933. The mill and dam are long since gone, but they are remembered along with Johnny McCall in the name of McCalls Dam State Park.

Nearby state parks
The following state parks are within  of McCalls Dam State Park:
Bald Eagle State Park (Centre County)
Bucktail State Park Natural Area ( Cameron and Clinton Counties)
Little Pine State Park (Lycoming County)
Milton State Park (Northumberland County)
Poe Paddy State Park (Centre County)
Poe Valley State Park (Centre County)
Ravensburg State Park (Clinton County)
R. B. Winter State Park (Union County)
Reeds Gap State Park (Mifflin County)
Sand Bridge State Park (Union County)
Shikellamy State Park (Northumberland and Union Counties)
Susquehanna State Park (Lycoming County)
Upper Pine Bottom State Park (Lycoming County)

References

External links

  

State parks of Pennsylvania
Protected areas established in 1933
Parks in Centre County, Pennsylvania
Protected areas of Centre County, Pennsylvania